Glynn Geddie (born 17 June 1990) is a British racing driver from Aberdeen, who last competed in the 2021 British Touring Car Championship for Team HARD. After spending his early racing career in GT cars and winning the 2011 British GT Championship, Geddie made his touring car debut in the 2014 British Touring Car Championship season.

Career

British GT Championship
Geddie made his debut in the British GT Championship in 2010 with Trackspeed, joining David Ashburn for the third round of the season at Knockhill. Geddie returned to the team full-time starting at the Rockingham round, the pair took four victories to secure the championship for Ashburn and second place for Geddie. For 2011 Geddie raced a Ferrari 458 Italia for CRS Racing alongside his dad Jim; the pair started the season in an older Ferrari F430 Scuderia GT3 while they awaited delivery of the new car. The pair went on to win the championship by 14 points over reigning champion Ashburn despite a best result of two-second-place finishes at Snetterton and Rockingham. The Geddies only competed in one event in the 2012 British GT season, racing an Apex Motorsport run McLaren MP4-12C GT3 at Silverstone where they finished fifth. Geddie joined United Autosports for opening race of the 2013 British GT season at Oulton Park, substituting for Rob Bell in the No. 23 McLaren alongside Zak Brown. Geddie returned to the team at Snetterton, partnering Jody Firth.

British Touring Car Championship

United Autosports (2014)

For 2014, Geddie raced for United Autosports in the British Touring Car Championship. Geddie would leave the team with two rounds remaining and was replaced by former race winner Luke Hines.

AmD Tuning (2018) 
Geddie returned to the championship in 2018 with the AmD Tuning team for the rounds at Rockingham and Knockhill, scoring points in the latter.

Team HARD (2020–21) 
After the departure mid-season of Ollie Brown, Geddie again made a return to the BTCC for the final two rounds of the 2020 season, driving a Volkswagen CC for Team HARD. Geddie then agreed a deal to remain with the team for 2021 driving a new Cupra Leon but took the decision to stand down from the seat after three rounds citing personal reasons.

Racing record

Complete British GT Championship results
(key) (Races in bold indicate pole position in class) (Races in italics indicate fastest lap in class)

† Driver did not finish, but was classified as he completed 90% race distance.

Complete Porsche Supercup results
(key) (Races in bold indicate pole position) (Races in italics indicate fastest lap)

‡ Guest driver – Not eligible for points.

Complete British Touring Car Championship results
(key) (Races in bold indicate pole position – 1 point awarded just in first race) (Races in italics indicate fastest lap – 1 point awarded all races) (* signifies that driver lead race for at least one lap – 1 point given all races)

Partial GT Cup Championship results
(key) (Races in bold indicate pole position in class – 1 point awarded just in first race; races in italics indicate fastest lap in class – 1 point awarded all races;-

† Geddie was ineligible for points as he was an invitation entry.

References

External links 
 
Profile from btcc.net
 

1990 births
Living people
Scottish racing drivers
British GT Championship drivers
Porsche Supercup drivers
International GT Open drivers
Blancpain Endurance Series drivers
British Touring Car Championship drivers
Porsche Carrera Cup GB drivers
Britcar drivers
24H Series drivers
CRS Racing drivers
United Autosports drivers